Yakov Alekseyevich Zayka (born 1 March 1991) is a former Russian professional football player.

Club career
He made his Russian Football National League debut for FC Shinnik Yaroslavl on 15 April 2012 in a game against FC Dynamo Bryansk. He also played in the FNL for Shinnik the following season (2012–13).

External links
 

1991 births
People from Novorossiysk
Living people
Russian footballers
Association football midfielders
FC Krasnodar players
FC Shinnik Yaroslavl players
Sportspeople from Krasnodar Krai